Braddock Peak is a mountain summit in the Never Summer Mountains range of the Rocky Mountains of North America.

Mountain

It is named for Dr. William A.  Braddock (1929–2003), Professor of Geological Sciences at the University of Colorado at Boulder from 1958 to 1994. He was the principal author of The Geologic Map of Rocky Mountain National Park. Following his retirement, Dr. Braddock taught the lay public about the geology in and around Rocky Mountain National Park.

Descriptions of hiking routes in this area that predate adoption of the Braddock Peak name refer to this summit as Point 11,960.

See also

List of Colorado mountain ranges
List of Colorado mountain summits
List of Colorado fourteeners
List of Colorado 4000 meter prominent summits
List of the most prominent summits of Colorado
List of Colorado county high points

References

External links

Mountains of Colorado
Mountains of Jackson County, Colorado
North American 3000 m summits